Travellers to Qatar require a visa unless:
they are citizens of one of the GCC countries.
they are citizens of one of the eligible countries for visa waiver.

Qatari visas can be obtained online by visitors wishing to enter Qatar, either from an official site, or Qatar Airways' website when travelling with the airline.

All visitors, except GCC citizens, must hold passports valid for at least three months from the date of arrival. GCC citizens are permitted use National ID Cards to enter Qatar.

Visa policy map

Freedom of movement 
Citizens of the following Gulf Cooperation Council countries enjoy freedom of movement in Qatar and do not require a visa to enter Qatar under any circumstances:

Visa exemption 
Citizens of the following 86 countries do not require a visa for short stay visits to Qatar:

90 days within a 180-day period

30 days

1 - Hotel reservations in one of the country's hotels made via Discover Qatar during the visit period must be confirmed.
2 - Nationals of Pakistan arriving from Pakistan must hold a polio vaccination certificate.

 and  signed visa-waiver agreement on 21 February 2022.

Visa on arrival

Nationals of the following countries can obtain a visa on arrival:

3 - Hotel reservations in one of the country's hotels made via Discover Qatar during the visit period must be confirmed.
4- For business trips if holding a credit card or at least QAR 5000 in cash, a return ticket, a hotel booking confirmation and an invitation letter from a company certified by the Qatari government

Electronic Travel Authorisation
From 27 September 2017, citizens of all nationalities who hold valid residence permits or visas from either Australia, Canada, New Zealand, the Schengen countries, the United Kingdom, the United States of America or the countries of the Gulf Cooperation Council can obtain an Electronic Travel Authorisation for up to 30 days. The visa may be extended online for 30 additional days.

Online visa
Qatar introduced an e-Visa system on 23 June 2017. All other countries except,  and  that do not qualify for visa on arrival may apply for a tourist visa online through the eVisa system. Visas are issued within four working days if all documents are submitted and are valid for a stay period up to 30 days in Qatar.

Transit
Regardless of nationality, travelers who are in transit through Hamad International Airport do not require a visa if they depart within 24 hours.

On 26 September 2016, the Ministry of the Interior announced the issuance of free transit visas for passengers of any nationality transiting through Hamad International Airport. Only travellers travelling on Qatar Airways, with layovers between 5 and 96 hours are eligible.

Diplomatic and service category passports
Holders of diplomatic or service category passports of the following countries do not require a visa:

D — diplomatic passports only

Visa waiver agreements for diplomatic, private and service passports was signed with

Visitor statistics
Most visitors arriving to Qatar were from the following countries of nationality:

See also

Visa requirements for Qatari citizens

External links
Visa policy of Qatar, Ministry of Interior
, Qatar Visa Application and Requirements

References

Qatar
Foreign relations of Qatar